Yoshikazu Sakai (酒井 喜和, Sakai Yoshikazu) is a Japanese paralympic swimmer who competes mainly in category S11 events.

Yoshikazu competed in two paralympics for the Japanese swimming team first in 2000 and then again in 2004. In 2000 he set a new world record in both the heats and the final of the 100m backstroke and was part of the Japanese relay team that broke the  medley record to beat Great Britain by 0.07 seconds, he also won a silver in the 100m freestyle and a bronze medal in the 100m butterfly after breaking the world record in the heats only to see Raman Makarau and Ian Sharpe go quicker in the second heat and both go even quicker in the final. He also swam in the 400m freestyle finishing fourth and finished sixth in the 50m freestyle.

References

External links
 

Year of birth missing (living people)
Living people
Japanese male backstroke swimmers
Japanese male medley swimmers
Japanese male butterfly swimmers
Japanese male freestyle swimmers
Paralympic swimmers of Japan
Paralympic gold medalists for Japan
Paralympic silver medalists for Japan
Paralympic bronze medalists for Japan
Paralympic medalists in swimming
Swimmers at the 2000 Summer Paralympics
Swimmers at the 2004 Summer Paralympics
Medalists at the 2000 Summer Paralympics
Medalists at the 2004 Summer Paralympics
S12-classified Paralympic swimmers
21st-century Japanese people